The Trenton Athletics was an American soccer club based in Trenton, New Jersey that was a member of the reformed American Soccer League.

Year-by-year

See also
Football in the United States
List of football clubs in the United States

References

Defunct soccer clubs in New Jersey
American Soccer League (1933–1983) teams
Sports in Trenton, New Jersey